Shivaram Mony, is an Indian feature film director and editor who works in Malayalam cinema. He made his directorial debut through Matchbox produced by Revathy Kalamandir owned by G.Suresh Kumar & Menaka. His second feature as a director, editor and a writer was Thi.Mi.Ram which was released on NeeStream OTT platform in April 2021. Thi.Mi.Ram was selected to be included in the Indian Panorama of Chennai International Film Festival 2021. His third feature film is Shubhadinam which was directed and edited by him. Currently he is working on his next feature along with a new generation web series project. He owns and operates his own production house named The Social Scape.

Early life 
Shivaram was born on 1989 in Thiruvananthapuram, Kerala. 
He did his schooling in Kendriya Vidyalaya, Trivandrum. He acquired his bachelor's degree in Visual communication with gold medal from Dr G R Damodaran College of Science, Coimbatore.

Career

2006–2011 
Sivaram started off as a short film maker in 2006. Since then he went on to make several short films which won awards in International and National film festivals. In 2008, he moved to Coimbatore and was based there until 2011. During that time, he completed his under graduation.

2011–2016 
Sivaram worked based out of Chennai during this time period and was known among his counterparts as an editor and director. He also worked in several media related agencies as creative director and editor. He made his entry into mainstream cinema as location editor and worked for several Tamil films. In 2016, he shifted his base back to his hometown Trivandrum to work in Malayalam industry.

2017–present 
Sivaram debuted as feature film director with Matchbox, which was released in 72 theatres across Kerala. The film rights were purchased by Asianet. His second feature as a director, editor and a writer was Thi.Mi.Ram  which was released on NeeStream OTT platform in April 2021. Thi.Mi.Ram was selected to be included in the Indian Panorama of Chennai International Film Festival 2021. The film bagged 23 awards in international film festivals around the globe. His ongoing feature film is Shubhadinam which is directed and edited by him starring Indrans and Gireesh Neyyar. Film is released on October 14, 2022 in 50 theatres across Kerala and had a run of 21 days in the theatres.

Filmography

Short films 

 Mizhineerpookal (2006)
 Preritham (2007)
 Culprit (2007)
 Aazhangal (2009)
 Dhruvam (2010)
 Unheard (2011)
 In Conversation with God (2013)
 Dil Chahta Hai Ki Band Baja Baarat Ke Saath Dilwale Dulhaniya Le Jayenge (2014)
 Pillow Talk (2015)
 My Hero (2016)
 Scope (2016)

Documentary films 

 Vishwakshema (2013 ) - a film on Gurukulam education
 Legends of Tomorrow (2014) - a film on IFB Boca juniors
 Pakshi Pani Bheethi Venda (2014) - a film by Kerala Veterinary and Animal Sciences University
 One Health for Man Animal and Nature (2015) - a film by COHEART

Music video 

 Mizhiyile, a music video by OHM

As editor 

 Un manam sollum, a promotional song from Gubeer (2014)
 Theemai dhaan vellum, a promotional song from Thani Oruvan (2015)
 LAXMI, 2020, Malayalam web series
 Thi.Mi.Ram(2019), a Malayalam feature film
 Shubhadinam(2022), a Malayalam feature film

As actor

Actor in cinema 
 Matchbox (2017), as Sathyan (Guest Appearance)
 Thi.Mi.Ram (2019), as Kuttan (Guest Appearance)
 Shubhadinam (2022), as Associate Director in Audition Scene (Guest Appearance)

Actor in web Series 
 LAXMI (2020), as Annan

Child artist in television serials 
 Vidhi (2000) telecasted in Asianet
 Kaliyalla kalyanam (2001)  telecasted in Kairali TV

Child artist in cinemas 
 The Car (1997)- directed by Rajasenan
 Kondattam (1998)- directed by K. S. Ravikumar
 Aayiram Meni(1999)- directed by I.V.Sasi

Actor in short films 
 Aazhangal (2009), as interviewer
 Dhruvam (2010), as hero's friend
 Screwed time stacks (2012), as lead actor- directed by Deepak
 In Conversation with God (2013), as chess player
 Foto(2014), as lead actor- directed by Vanathi Kathir
 Johny Antony (2022), as lead actor- directed by Nazim Rani

Accolades

Awards for feature film 
Kerala State Film Critics Awards 2020 
 Tagore International Film Festival, Kolkatta 2020, Best Feature Film 
 Panjim International Film Festival (Piff 2020)  Goa, Best Feature Film & Best Director 
 Druk International Film Festival (Diff2020) Bhutan, Best Feature Film 
 7th Art Independent International Film Festival (Saiiff2020)-kerala
 Virgin Spring Cine Fest (Vscf 2020) Kolkata, Best Director
 International Panoramic Film Festival of India 2021, Honorary Mention for Direction 
 Prisma International Film Festival 2020, Rome, Official Selection 
 Bricks International Film Festival (Biff 2020), Moscow, Official Selection 
 Straight Jacket Guerilla Film Festival 2020, Official Selection  
 Indic Film Utsav 2020, Official Selection 
 Indian Panorama at 18th Chennai International Film Festival (Ciff), 
 Sun of the East Awards 2020, Kolkata - Nominee for Best Feature Film 
 Golden Galaxy Awards 2020, Kolkata - Nominee for Best Feature Film 
 Creator in Crisis Film Festival 2020, Singapore - Best Director

Awards for short films
 Preritham: Special jury teen, Teenreels (Kerala Chalachithra Academy,2007) 
 Aazhangal: Best film, Bimbam International short film festival, 2010 
 Therefore, we: Best editor, AISFDF 2013 
 In conversation with god: best film, best director, AISFDF 2014 Coimbatore.
 Vishwakshema: Best documentary AISFDF 2014 Coimbatore. 
 Legends of tomorrow: Best documentary, Christ college Bengaluru 2015 & AISFDF 2015
 Wings of Fire: Best Editor, My Mumbai short film festival 2015. 
 The unheard: CANON best PSA award, 2012
 My Hero: Top 15 Deserving Films of Yes I am the Change 2016

References

External links
 Sivaram Mony on LinkedIn
 
 
 

1989 births
20th-century Indian male actors
21st-century Indian male actors
Film directors from Thiruvananthapuram
Film editors from Kerala
Indian male child actors
Living people
Malayalam film directors
Malayalam film editors
Male actors from Thiruvananthapuram
Male actors in Malayalam cinema
Tamil film editors